The Italian People's Party (PPI) was a Christian-democratic, centrist and Christian-leftist political party in Italy. The party was a member of the European People's Party (EPP).

The PPI was the formal successor of the Christian Democracy (DC), but was soon deprived of its conservative elements, which successively formed the Christian Democratic Centre (CCD) in 1994 and the United Christian Democrats (CDU) in 1995. The PPI was finally merged into Democracy is Freedom – The Daisy (DL) in 2002, and DL was later merged with the Democrats of the Left (DS) and minor centre-left parties into Democratic Party (PD) in 2007.

History
The party emerged in January 1994 as the successor to the Christian Democracy (DC), Italy's dominant party since World War II, following the final national council of the DC and the split of a right-wing faction led by Pier Ferdinando Casini, which had formed the Christian Democratic Centre (CCD). The first secretary of the PPI was Mino Martinazzoli, which led the party to a big defeat (11.1% of the vote) in the 1994 general election, fought in coalition with the Segni Pact, under the Pact for Italy banner. After the election, Martinazzoli was replaced as secretary by conservative philosopher Rocco Buttiglione.

In 1995, when his proposal to join the centre-right Pole of Freedoms coalition (composed of Forza Italia, National Alliance and the CCD) was rejected by the party's national council, Buttiglione, along with Roberto Formigoni, Gianfranco Rotondi and other bigwigs, formed the United Christian Democrats (CDU), leaving the PPI in the hands of the late DC's leftist factions, becoming part of the centre-left coalition.

For the 1996 general election the PPI formed the Populars for Prodi list with the Democratic Union (UD), the Italian Republican Party (PRI) and the South Tyrolean People's Party (SVP). The list was part of The Olive Tree, the formal alliance of the centre-left coalition, and won 6.8% of the vote. The PPI was represented in Romano Prodi's first government by three ministers: Beniamino Andreatta at Defence, Rosy Bindi at Health and Michele Pinto at Agriculture. Additionally, Nicola Mancino was President of the Senate.

In the 1999 European Parliament election the PPI was damaged by the competition from The Democrats (Dem), a centrist and social-liberal party launched by Prodi: the PPI won only 4.3% of the vote, while The Democrats took 7.7%.

For the 2001 general election the PPI formed a joint list with The Democrats, the Union of Democrats for Europe (UDEUR) and Italian Renewal (RI). The list, named Democracy is Freedom – The Daisy (DL), won 14.5% of vote. In 2002 DL was transformed into a full-fledged party, the PPI was merged into it and a cultural association named The Populars was formed. DL would later be merged, along with the Democrats of the Left (DS) and minor centre-left parties, into the Democratic Party (PD), of which The Populars became a faction. Two members of the PPI and DL, Enrico Letta and Matteo Renzi, would successively serve as Prime Ministers in 2013–2016.

Electoral results

Italian Parliament

European Parliament

Leadership
Secretary: Mino Martinazzoli (1994), Rocco Buttiglione (1994–1995), Gerardo Bianco (1995–1997), Franco Marini (1997–1999), Pierluigi Castagnetti (1999–2002)
Deputy Secretary: Enrico Letta (1997–1998), Dario Franceschini (1997–1999) 
Coordinator: Dario Franceschini (1997–1999), Lapo Pistelli (1999–2002)
President: Rosa Russo Jervolino (1994), Giovanni Bianchi (1994–1997), Gerardo Bianco (1997–1999)
Party Leader in the Chamber of Deputies: Beniamino Andreatta (1994–1996), Antonello Soro (1996–2001)
Party Leader in the Senate: Nicola Mancino (1994–1996), Leopoldo Elia (1996–2001)
Party Leader in the European Parliament: Pierluigi Castagnetti (1994–1999), Guido Bodrato (1999–2004)

Symbols
Before the secession of the CDU, the PPI’s logo was adaptation of the old DC’s logo.

References

External links

1994 establishments in Italy
2002 disestablishments in Italy
Centrist parties in Italy
Christian democratic parties in Italy
Defunct Christian political parties
Defunct political parties in Italy
Political parties established in 1994
Political parties disestablished in 2002